Daniel Mannberg (born December 27, 1992) is a Swedish professional ice hockey player currently under contract with Modo Hockey of the HockeyAllsvenskan (Allsv).

He originally played with Luleå HF in the Elitserien during the 2010–11 Elitserien season. He has also featured with Brynäs IF in the SHL.

References

External links

1992 births
Almtuna IS players
Asplöven HC players
Brynäs IF players
Luleå HF players
Living people
Modo Hockey players
Swedish ice hockey forwards